Leonard Koppett (September 15, 1923 – June 22, 2003) was an American sportswriter.

Born in Moscow as Leonard Kopeliovich, Koppett moved with his family from Moscow, Russia to the United States when he was five years old. They lived in The Bronx, New York, a block away from Yankee Stadium.

Koppett served in the United States Army before graduating from Columbia University in 1946. He then worked as a reporter and columnist for the New York Herald Tribune, the New York Post, The New York Times, the Peninsula Times Tribune, and The Sporting News, and authored 22 books on sports.  He also published a number of magazine articles.

Best known were his works on baseball: Concise History of Major League Baseball (1998, updated through 2004) and The Thinking Fan's Guide to Baseball (originally titled A Thinking Man's Guide to Baseball, 1967, renamed for gender neutrality and updated several times through 2004) are considered definitive works on the game.  The former was inspired by Koppett's conversations with contemporary athletes who had little or no knowledge about the history of their game and the great players of decades past, while the latter memorably began with a one-word paragraph — "Fear." — and then explored how the batter's instinctive fear of the thrown pitch is the key point around which most other aspects of baseball play are derived.

The Essence of the Game is Deception: Thinking about Basketball took a similar approach to basketball.

Two weeks prior to his death, Koppett completed his final book, The Rise and Fall of the Press Box, which is part autobiography and part memoir about changes in sports media coverage since World War II when he became a sportswriter.

Koppett received the J. G. Taylor Spink Award from the Baseball Hall of Fame in 1992 and the Curt Gowdy Media Award by the Basketball Hall of Fame in 1994.

According to his daughter Katherine Koppett Richter, shortly before his death at age 79 in San Francisco, Koppett commented, "Every decade of my life has been better than the decade before."

References

1923 births
2003 deaths
Sportswriters from New York (state)
Soviet emigrants to the United States
American people of Russian descent
People from the Bronx
BBWAA Career Excellence Award recipients
Columbia College (New York) alumni